Rani is an Indian given name or refers to a female princely ruler.

Rani may also refer to:

Film and television 
 Rani (1943 film), a Bollywood film
 Rani (1952 film), Indian Tamil language film
 Rani (Pakistani TV series), a Pakistani TV series.
 Rani (French TV series), a 2011 French TV series

People
 Rani (Pakistani actress) (1946–1993), Pakistani film and television actress
 Rani (Tamil actress), Indian actress
 Rani (Australian singer) (born 1971)
 Rani (Dutch singer) (born 1999)

Other uses 
 Rani (tribe), a medieval Slavic tribe.
 Rani, Rajasthan, an Indian city, situated in Rajasthan's state.
 Räni, an Estonian village.
 Rani, Iran, an Iranian village in Fars Province.
 Rani (poem), a Malayalam narrative poem, written by Thirunalloor Karunakaran.
 Rani, an island in Supiori Regency,  Papua province, Indonesia
 Raney Nickel, often abbreviated as RaNi
 The Rani (Doctor Who), a fictional character in TV's Doctor Who

See also 
 Ranni (disambiguation)